Fiona Bryde Gore, Countess of Arran (née Colquhoun; 20 July 191816 May 2013) was a Scottish powerboating racer who was awarded the 1980 Segrave Trophy.
She held the record for the fastest woman on water.

World Record

Marriage
Gore was born to Geraldine Bryde Tennant and her husband Iain Colquhoun, Baronet. By her marriage to Arthur Gore, 8th Earl of Arran, she was Countess of Arran. She had two sons, the oldest Arthur Gore, 9th Earl of Arran.

Powerboating background
Fiona Colquhoun was introduced to speedboats when she was a passenger in Miss England III in its trial runs on Loch Lomond.

References

1918 births
2013 deaths
Scottish motorsport people
Scottish female racing drivers
Segrave Trophy recipients
20th-century Scottish people
21st-century Scottish people
British motorboat racers
20th-century Scottish women
21st-century Scottish women
Daughters of baronets
Arran